Orientozeuzera roepkei is a moth in the family Cossidae. It was described by Yakovlev in 2011. It is found in Taiwan and Japan.

References

Natural History Museum Lepidoptera generic names catalog

Zeuzerinae
Moths described in 2011